Charles Chubb may refer to:

Charles Chubb (ornithologist) (1851–1924), British ornithologist
Charles Chubb (businessman) (1772–1845), British locksmith and businessman, the founder of Chubb Locks
Charles Archibald Chubb, 2nd Baron Hayter (1871–1967), great grandson of Charles Chubb, who founded Chubb and Sons Lock and Safe Co; director and managing director of family firm
Charles E. Chubb (1845–1930), Australian judge of the Supreme Court of Queensland